The Joana Limestone is a limestone geologic formation in White Pine County and Nye County Nevada.

Description
The Joana Limestone was named for exposures at the Joana Mine on the south side of Robinson Canyon, 2 miles north of Ely, Nevada.

It was formed during the Early Mississippian series of the Carboniferous Period

Fossils
It preserves fossils dating back to the Carboniferous period.

See also

 List of fossiliferous stratigraphic units in Nevada
 Paleontology in Nevada

References

Geologic formations of Nevada
Limestone formations of the United States
Geography of Nye County, Nevada
Geography of White Pine County, Nevada
Carboniferous geology of Nevada
Mississippian United States
Carboniferous System of North America
Carboniferous southern paleotropical deposits